This is a list of wars involving the Democratic Republic of the Congo.

Congo Free State (1885–1908)

Belgian Congo (1908–1960)

Republic of the Congo (Léopoldville) (1960–1971)

Zaire (1971–1997)

Democratic Republic of the Congo (from 1997)

 
Congo, Democratic Republic of the
Wars